John Gottfred "Youngy" Johnson (July 22, 1873 in San Francisco – August 28, 1936 in Berkeley, California) was an American baseball player. He played in the National League with the Philadelphia Phillies and the New York Giants. He played his first game on April 29, 1897.

External links

New York Giants (NL) players
Philadelphia Phillies players
1873 births
1936 deaths
Baseball players from California
Major League Baseball pitchers
19th-century baseball players
Ishpeming-Nagaunee Unions players
Lincoln Treeplanters players
San Francisco Athletics players
Oakland Oaks (baseball) players
Stockton Wasps players
Los Angeles Angels (minor league) players
Oakland Commuters players